The 2006 Brno Superbike World Championship round was the seventh round of the 2006 Superbike World Championship. It took place on the weekend of July 21–23, 2006 at the Masaryk Circuit located in Brno.

Results

Superbike race 1 classification

Superbike race 2 classification

Supersport race classification

References
 Superbike Race 1
 Superbike Race 2
 Supersport Race

Brno Round
Brno Superbike